Gabriella Szabó (born 14 August 1986) is a Hungarian sprint canoer who has competed since the late 2000s.

Career
She won the silver medal in the K-4 500 m event at the 2008 Summer Olympics in Beijing.

Szabó also won five medals at the ICF Canoe Sprint World Championships with four golds (K-2 500 m: 2009, 2010; K-2 1000 m: 2010; K-4 500 m: 2011) and a bronze (K-2 1000 m: 2007).

Szabó also won a gold medal at the London Olympics in the Kayak Four (K4) 500m team event with Danuta Kozák, Katalin Kovács and Krisztina Fazekas for Hungary

In June 2015, she competed in the inaugural European Games, for Hungary in canoe sprint, more specifically, Women's K-4 500m with Anna Kárász, Danuta Kozák, and Ninetta Vad. She earned a gold medal.

In August 2016, she also won two gold medals at the Summer Olympics in Rio de Janeiro in the Kayak Double (K2) 500m with Danuta Kozák and in the Kayak Four (K4) 500m team event with Danuta Kozák, Tamara Csipes and Krisztina Fazekas Zur for Hungary. In both teams she served as the stroke for the unit.

Awards
 Junior Príma award (2008)
 Perpetual champion of Hungarian Kayak-Canoe (2012)
 Honorary Citizen of Zugló (2012)
 Hungarian university athlete of the year (1): 2015

Orders and special awards
   Order of Merit of the Republic of Hungary – Knight's Cross (2008)
   Order of Merit of Hungary – Officer's Cross (2012)
   Order of Merit of Hungary – Commander's Cross (2016)

References

External links
 
 
 
 
 

1986 births
Living people
Canoeists from Budapest
Canoeists at the 2008 Summer Olympics
Canoeists at the 2012 Summer Olympics
Canoeists at the 2016 Summer Olympics
Hungarian female canoeists
Olympic canoeists of Hungary
Olympic silver medalists for Hungary
Olympic medalists in canoeing
Olympic gold medalists for Hungary
ICF Canoe Sprint World Championships medalists in kayak
Medalists at the 2016 Summer Olympics
Medalists at the 2012 Summer Olympics
Medalists at the 2008 Summer Olympics
European Games medalists in canoeing
European Games gold medalists for Hungary
Canoeists at the 2015 European Games